was a  light cruiser in the Imperial Japanese Navy (IJN), named after the Naka River in the Tochigi and Ibaraki prefectures of eastern Japan. Naka was the third (and final) vessel completed in the Sendai class of light cruisers, and like other vessels of her class, she was intended for use as the flagship of a destroyer flotilla.

Service career
Naka was completed at Mitsubishi Yokohama on 30 November 1925.

On 26 November 1941, Naka became flagship of 4th Destroyer Flotilla under Rear Admiral Shōji Nishimura. At the time of the attack on Pearl Harbor, Naka was engaged in the invasion of the southern Philippines as part of Vice Admiral Ibo Takahashi's Third Fleet escorting transports with components of the IJA 48th Infantry Division. Naka was slightly damaged by strafing by five Boeing B-17 Flying Fortress bombers and Seversky P-35 Guardsman and Curtiss P-40 Kittyhawk fighters of the United States Army Air Forces (USAAF) Far East Air Force.

In January 1942, 4th Destroyer Flotilla was assigned to the invasion of the Netherlands East Indies, escorting a convoy carrying the Kure No. 2 Special Naval Landing Force (SNLF) and Sakaguchi Brigade to Tarakan and Balikpapan, Borneo. On 24 January 1942 while landing troops at Balikpapan, the Royal Netherlands Navy submarine , operating on the surface due to poor weather, fired four torpedoes at Naka, but missed.

In late February 1942, 4th Destroyer Flotilla escorted transports with the 48th Infantry Division to Makassar, Celebes and eastern Java. Naka was thus in a central position for the Battle of the Java Sea on 27 February 1942.

The destroyers launched 56 torpedoes in addition to 8 torpedoes from Naka, but amazingly failed to hit anything. Asagumo closed with the Electra, sinking it in a gun battle. Jupiter hit a Dutch mine and sank. Towards midnight, De Ruyter and Java were hit by torpedoes and exploded. This engagement was followed by the Battle of Sunda Strait, the next day on 28 February 1942, at which Naka was not present.
 
In March, Naka was assigned patrol duties between Java and the Celebes. However, on 14 March 1942, Naka received orders to become flagship for the Christmas Island invasion force. Landing operations progressed without opposition on 31 March 1942, however, the submarine  fired four torpedoes at Naka, but all missed. Seawolf tried again with two more torpedoes the following day, 1 April 1942, and this time one hit to starboard near her No. 1 boiler. Natori towed the badly damaged Naka to Bantam Bay, Java for temporary repairs, and Naka then proceeded to Singapore under her own power. The damage was sufficient to justify a return to Japan for further repairs in June. Naka remained in Japan in reserve until April 1943.

For the next several months, Naka was assigned to make troop transport runs around the Marshall Islands and Nauru. On 21 October 1943, Naka and Isuzu embarked Army troops at Shanghai. The convoy was intercepted by the submarine  in the East China Sea on 23 October 1943, which fired 10 torpedoes, failing to damage either cruiser. Naka suffered a near-miss, and arrived at Rabaul on 5 November 1943, the same day as the Carrier Raid on Rabaul. On 23 November 1943, Naka departed Ponape with troop reinforcements for Tarawa, but the island fell to the Americans before the reinforcements could be landed.

From 17–18 February 1944, Naka assisted light cruiser , which had been torpedoed the day before by the submarine . Immediately after Naka departed, Truk was attacked by US Navy Task Force 58 in Operation Hailstone. The Americans sank 31 transports and 10 naval vessels (two cruisers, four destroyers and four auxiliary vessels), destroyed nearly 200 aircraft and damaged severely about 100 more, eliminating Truk as a major base for the IJN. Some 240 crewmen perished, but patrol boats rescued 210 men including Captain Sutezawa.

Naka was removed from the navy list on 31 March 1944.

Notes

References

External links
  
Tabular record:   CombinedFleet.com: Naka history

Further reading

- First-hand account of the torpedoing of Naka at Christmas Island by the captain of the Japanese destroyer Amatsukaze

Sendai-class cruisers
1925 ships
World War II cruisers of Japan
World War II shipwrecks in the Pacific Ocean
Cruisers sunk by aircraft
Maritime incidents in February 1944
Ships sunk by US aircraft
Ships built by Mitsubishi Heavy Industries